Lamott is a surname. Notable people with the surname include:

Anne Lamott (born 1954), American novelist and non-fiction writer
Kenneth Lamott (1923–1979), American writer
Nancy LaMott (1951–1995), American singer

See also
Lamont (name)